The Gates of Firestorm Peak is an adventure module for the second edition of the Advanced Dungeons & Dragons fantasy role-playing game. The adventure was published in 1996, and was written by Bruce Cordell, with cover art by Jeff Easley and interior art by Arnie Swekel.

Design
The Gates of Firestorm Peak incorporates the "Player's Option" rules into the adventure scenario, especially those from Player's Option: Combat & Tactics and Player's Option: Skills & Powers. The Gates of Firestorm Peak was designed to be used with both the standard and Player's Option AD&D rules, and adds Player's Option Consideration comments at the end of each description or encounter. The Far Realm, a Lovecraftian plane of madness, was created by Bruce Cordell for The Gates of Firestorm Peak.

Plot summary
In The Gates of Firestorm Peak, deep within a mountain, many years ago, the Elder Elves carved out a portal that enabled them to explore new worlds. Powered by the Dragon's Tear, a comet on a 27-year cycle, the elves managed to connect directly into an alternate reality. The elves are now long gone but the link remains intact and, with the return of the comet, a whole alien world is about to spill out.

The Gates of Firestorm Peak begins in the Shirelands at the village of Longbridge, located in the foothills of the mountain range that contains Firestorm Peak. In prehistory, the Elder Elves thrived during a previous Age of the world, and created a magical laboratory under Firestorm Peak where they opened a gate to the Far Realm which opens every 27 years. Over time, the bizarre physical laws and alien madness of the other dimension began to warp the areas underneath the mountain. Three hundred years ago a colony of duergar settled nearby and became guardians of the corrupted area. Decades ago, the evil conjurer Madreus bypassed the duergar and gained mastery of the Far Realm creatures residing in the complex underneath Firestorm Peak. In the last five years, he gained control of the duergar, and his studies and experiments have begun to cause manifestations of warped behavior in nature and society to spread beyond the legendary mountain. If not stopped by the player characters, the gate will eventually provide Madreus with the energies and allies he needs to bring the Far Realm's madness to the rest of the world.

Reception
Trenton Webb reviewed The Gates of Firestorm Peak for Arcane magazine, rating it a 9 out of 10 overall. He called the adventure's premise "strong, if a little Stargatey" noting that it "would normally be enough to justify an adventure module. And it would be worthy of note for its solid design, varied structure and high-quality supplementary artwork. Yet what really makes Firestorm Peak different is that it's designed to be used with both the standard and Player's Option AD&D rules." Webb commented more fully on the Player's Option rules: "Now while the Player's Option series undoubtedly refined a woefully inadequate combat system and cleaned up spell casting, it did introduce a cartload of new rules too. And although each of these new rules was clearly explained in isolation, seeing them all in practice is an absolute must if you're to grasp the full impact of the system. As the first 'showcase' supplement for the system, Firestorm Peak does an excellent job." He continued: "With the simple addition of Player's Option Consideration comments at the end of each description or encounter, referees can see where the standard and Player's Option games differ. More importantly, these footnotes illustrate the extra depth that can be added to play if used well." Webb concluded his review by saying: "The Gates of Firestorm Peak is a totally playable, if somewhat long, adventure for all AD&D hackers. As a showcase for the Player's Option series, though, it works as both an illustrative guide to the new rules and an advert. Because if you haven't toyed with the new rules, you'll be wondering just why its players get some large-scale maps and cardboard cut-out pieces, but old-style AD&Ders don't."

The Gates of Firestorm Peak was ranked the 11th greatest Dungeons & Dragons adventure of all time by Dungeon magazine in 2004, on the 30th anniversary of the Dungeons & Dragons game.

References

Dungeons & Dragons modules
Role-playing game supplements introduced in 1996